Dr.Salur Koteshwara Rao, known professionally as Koti, is an Indian composer, record producer, and singer who predominantly works in Telugu and Hindi films. He has composed music for over 475 films. The son of veteran composer S. Rajeswara Rao, in early 1980s Koti teamed with Somaraju (Raj), son of T. V. Raju, and the resulting duo was known as Raj–Koti. The duo composed music for about 180 films from their debut in 1983 till their separation in 1994. After the separation, Koti has composed music and background score for more than 350+ movies. He won Nandi Award for Best Music Director for the film Hello Brother (1994).

He started his music career as an assistant to music director K. Chakravarthy. Composers such as A. R. Rahman, Mani Sharma ,Harris Jayaraj, Devi Sri Prasad  and S. Thaman, worked as keyboard programmers with Koti during the initial part of their career. Roshan Saluri, son of Koti is also introduced as film score composer. Another son Rajeev Saluri started his career as an actor.

Solo career filmography

 Amma Donga (1995)
 Alluda Majaka (1995)
 Gadibidi Aliya (1995)
 Love Game (1995)
 Bhale Bullodu (1995)
 Rikshavodu (1995)
 Sankalpam (1995)
 Aayanaki Iddaru (1995)
 Telugu Veera Levara (1995)
 Tapassu (1995)
 Ketu Duplicatu (1995)
 Peddarayudu (1995)
 Subhamasthu (1995)
 Trimurti (1995) - Hindi film. (Background score only.)
 Pellaala Rajyam (1996)
 Vamsanikokkadu (1996)
 Sarada Bullodu (1996)
 Akkada Ammayi Ikkada Abbayi (1996)
 Jeet (1995) - Hindi film. (Background score only.)
 Hello Mogudu Bhale Pellam (1996)
 Jeevanadhi (1996, Kannada)
 Jeet (1996) (Hindi; Background score)
 Hello Neeku Naaku Pellanta (1996)
 Akka Bagunnava (1996)
 Nayudu Gaari Kutumbam (1996)
 Soggadi Pellam (1996)
 Intlo Illalu Vantintlo Priyuralu (1997)
 Peddannayya (1997)
 Muddula Mogudu (1997)
 Hitler (1997)
 Subhakankshalu (1997)
 Chelikaadu (1997)
 Chilakkottudu (1997)
 Collector Gaaru (1997)
 Abbaygari Pelli (1997)
 Bobbili Dora (1997)
 Gokulamlo Seetha (1997)
 Korukunna Priyudu (1997)
 Maa Nannaki Pelli (1997)
 Pelli Chesukundam (1997)
 Priya O Priya (1997)
 Priyamaina Srivaru (1997)
 Jai Bajarangbali (1997)
 Jagadeka Veerudu (1997)
 Judwaa (1997) (Hindi film; Background Score)
 Taraka Ramudu (1997)
 Yuvaratna Raana(1998)
 Khaidi Gaaru (1998)
 Prema Pallaki (1998)
 Mee Aayana Jagratha (1998)
 Shrivaarante Maavare (1998)
 Kanyadanam (1998)
 Gillikajjalu (1998)
 Maavidaakulu (1998)
 Pavitra Prema (1998)
 Snehitulu (1998)
 Shrimati Vellosta (1998)
 Pape Naa Pranam (1998)
 Subhavartha (1998)
 Subhalekhalu (1998)
Sooryavansham (1999) (Hindi; Background score)
 Ramasakkanodu (1999)
 Chinni Chinnni Aasa (1999)
 Sultan (1999)
 Pilla Nachchindi (1999)
 Krishna Babu (1999)
 Vamshoddharakudu (2000)
 Oke Maata (2000)
 Okkadu Chaalu (2000)
 Chala Bagundi (2000)
 Goppinti Alludu (2000)
 Nuvve Kavali (2000)
 Veedekkadi Mogudandi? (2001)
 Prema Sandadi (2001)
 Naalo Unna Prema (2001)
 Maduve Aagona Baa (2001; Kannada film)
 Darling Darling (2001)
 Nuvvu Naaku Nachav (2001)
 Repallelo Radha (2001)
 Adhipathi (2001)
 June July (2002)
 Manamiddaram (2002)
 Kondaveeti Simhasanam (2002)
 Neetho Cheppalani (2002)
 Sandade Sandadi (2002)
 Nuvve Nuvve (2002)
Bahala Chennagide (2002; Kannada)
 Hai (2002)
 Vijayam (2003)
 Ela Cheppanu (2003)
 Maa Bapu Bommaku Pellanta (2003)
Swetha Naagu (2004)
 Naalo Unna Prema (2004)
 Vijayendra Varma (2004)
 Gowri (2004)
 Rowdy Aliya (2004; Kannada)
 Anandamanandamaye (2004)
 Malliswari (2004)
 Shweta Nagu (2004)
 Preminchukunnam Pelliki Randi (2004)
 Dost (2004)
 Mr. Errababu (2005)
 Nayakudu (2005)
 Nuvvante Naakishtam (2005)
 Ganga (2006)
 Premante Inte (2006)
 Notebook (2006)
 Gopi – Goda Meedha Pilli (2006)
 Classmates (2007)
 Mee Sreyobhilashi (2007)
 Podarillu (2007)
 Aalayam (2008)
 Blade Babji (2008)
 Ek Police (2008)
 Kousalya Supraja Rama (2008)
 Manorama (2009)
 Nachchav Alludu (2009)
 Arundhati (2009)
 Aa Intlo (2009)
 Target (2009)
 Neramu Siksha (2009)
 Bendu Apparao R.M.P (2009)
 Aalasyam Amrutam (2010)
 Brammigaadi Katha (2011)
 Anaganaga O Dheerudu (2010) (2 Songs)
 Raaj (2011)
 Katha Screenplay Darshakatvam Appalaraju (2011)
 Kshetram (2011)
 Mugguru (2011)
 Aha Naa Pellanta!  (2011) (Background score)
 Onamalu (2012)
 Hitudu (2015)
 Mama Manchu Alludu Kanchu (2015)
 1997 (2022)
 Sehari (2022) (As actor) 
 Paga Paga Paga (2022) (As actor)

References

External links
 

Indian film score composers
Hindi film score composers
Tamil film score composers
Telugu film score composers
Jingle composers
Kannada film score composers
Living people
Telugu people
Film musicians from Andhra Pradesh
21st-century Indian composers
Indian folk-pop singers
Telugu playback singers
Santosham Film Awards winners
Indian male playback singers
20th-century Indian composers
Indian male film score composers
20th-century Indian male singers
20th-century Indian singers
Nandi Award winners
Filmfare Awards South winners
1958 births